Frank Deville (born 12 August 1970) is a Luxembourgian former professional footballer who played as a midfielder. He was a member of the Luxembourg national football team from 1995 to 2002.

His son is Maurice Deville.

References

1970 births
Living people
Luxembourgian footballers
Luxembourg international footballers
FC Swift Hesperange players
Union Luxembourg players
1. FC Union Berlin players
1. FC Saarbrücken players
FC Avenir Beggen players
FC Mondercange players
F91 Dudelange players
Association football midfielders
Luxembourgian expatriate footballers
Expatriate footballers in Germany
Luxembourgian expatriate sportspeople in Germany